Bill G. Tallman is an American politician serving as a member of the New Mexico Senate. from the 18th district Tallman previously served as deputy city manager of Santa Fe, New Mexico.

Education 
Tallman earned a Bachelor of Arts from Syracuse University in 1968 and a Master of Public Administration from the University of Cincinnati in 1972.

Career 
Tallman has worked as the City Manager of Moline, Illinois, New Castle, Pennsylvania, and Norwich, Connecticut. He also served as Town Manager of Smithfield, Rhode Island. After relocating to New Mexico to become Deputy City Manager of Santa Fe, he remained in the area and ran for a seat in the New Mexico Senate. A Democrat, Tallman represents the 18th district, which includes a portion of Albuquerque, New Mexico.

References 

Democratic Party New Mexico state senators
Syracuse University alumni
University of Cincinnati alumni
American city managers
Year of birth missing (living people)
Living people
21st-century American politicians